Gambling in Brazil has several legal restrictions. Casinos have been considered illegal in Brazil and considered a criminal misdemeanour since 1946, by a decree signed by President Eurico Gaspar Dutra, who would have been influenced by his wife Carmela Teles Dutra, who was known for her strong religiosity to Catholic Church. However, horse betting and sports betting are legal in Brazil. Since 1967, the state-owned bank Caixa Econômica Federal have the monopoly on the exploitation of lotteries in Brazil.

In 1993, commercial exploitation that offer bingo games and slot machines were legalized by the Zico Act, which provided for the commercial exploitation of bingo games to funding sports entities. In 1998, the Pelé Act revoked the Zico Act and created a special chapter regulating bingo exploitation. As of 2004, Provisional Measure 168, signed by President Luiz Inácio Lula da Silva, prohibited the commercial exploitation of bingos.

Currently, the debate on the legalization of gambling is controversial in Brazil and collides with ideological and religious issues. Since 1991, several bills proposing the legalization of gambling are being analyzed in the National Congress of Brazil. Parliamentarians in favor of the legalization of gambling in Brazil claim that gambling can increase the revenue to be generated by taxing the commercial exploitation of games of chance. Members of the National Congress opposed to the proposal, which include congressmen from the Evangelical Caucus, raise questions about the mental risks of gambling addiction and argue that exploitation of gambling can open the door to corruption and money laundering.

References

 
Economy of Brazil
Politics of Brazil